Fedyakino is the name of several rural localities in Russia:
Fedyakino, Moscow Oblast, a village in Savvinskoye Rural Settlement of Yegoryevsky District in Moscow Oblast; 
Fedyakino, Ryazan Oblast, a selo in Vakinsky Rural Okrug of Rybnovsky District in Ryazan Oblast